Eubie may refer to:

 Eubie Blake, a composer
 Eubie!, a 1978 Broadway musical
 Eubie, a fictional character in Higglytown Heroes